Network Computing Architecture may refer to:

 Network Computing Architecture, protocol created by Apollo Computer in their Network Computing System
 Network Computing Architecture, three-tier architecture by Oracle Corporation